Me, I'm All Smiles is a live compilation of Echo & the Bunnymen songs recorded in London in 2005, released in September 2006. It finishes, like their 1984 album, Ocean Rain, with the track "Ocean Rain". The cover artwork features sunflowers.

Track listing
"Going Up"
"With a Hip"
"Stormy Weather"
"Show of Strength"
"Bring on the Dancing Horses"
"The Disease"
"Scissors in the Sand"
"All That Jazz"
"The Back of Love"
"The Killing Moon"
"In the Margins"
"Never Stop"
"Villiers Terrace"
"Of a Life"
"Rescue"
"The Cutter"
"Nothing Lasts Forever"
"Lips Like Sugar"
"Ocean Rain"

External links
The Ultimate Echo and the Bunnymen Discography, Tab & Lyric Site

Echo & the Bunnymen live albums
2006 live albums